José Echeveste Galfarsoro (19 March 1899 – 7 December 1982) was a Spanish footballer who played as a forward for Real Unión and for the Spain national team. He spent all 13 seasons of his playing career with Real Unión, thus being a historical member of the club and part of the so-called one-club men group. He played a pivotal role in the Unión team that won two Copa del Rey in the 1920s, in 1924 and 1927, netting the winning goals in both finals.

Club career
Born in Irun, Gipuzkoa, Echeveste began playing football with his hometown club Real Unión in 1919, with whom he spent his entire career, playing 13 seasons with the club until his retirement in 1932. He was thus a member of the historic Real Unión side of the 1920s, which also included René Petit and Luis Regueiro. He played a fundamental role in the team that won two Copa del Rey in the 1920s, in 1924 and 1927, netting the winning goal in both finals to help his side to 1–0 victories over the likes of Real Madrid in 1924 and Arenas de Getxo in 1927, thus contributing decisively to two of the club's four Cup titles in its history, while also becoming in the first and only played to achieve such a feat. In the same way, and being the tournament that gave access to the national cup, he won a total of three Biscay Championships.

In 1929, he played seven games in the newly created La Liga. In that same year, he also played one unofficial match for FC Barcelona. He played his last match in the first Division on 11 January 1931 against Alavés.

International career
Echeveste earned four international caps for the Spain national team, the first of which in a friendly match against France on 30 April 2022 in which he helped his nation to a comfortable 4–0 win. He then had to wait three years for his next cap on 1 June 1925, against Switzerland, in another comfortable win (3–0). His last two caps were both againstItaly, the latter of which on 29 May 1927 in a 0–2 loss.

Honours
Real Unión
North Regional Championship:
Winners (3) 1921–22, 1923–24, 1926–27

Copa del Rey:
Winners (2) 1924 and 1927
Runners-up (1): 1922

References

1899 births
1982 deaths
Spanish footballers
Spain international footballers